This list accompanies the article Storytelling festival.

Storytelling events

StorySLAM (US)
Young Storyteller of the Year (UK)

Storytelling festivals

National Storytelling Festival (US)
Southern Ohio Storytelling Festival
Timpanogos Storytelling Festival
Yukon International Storytelling Festival

See also
Valuable additions may be found in :fr:Festival de conte

References

Cultural lists
Lists of theatre festivals